Yizhou, formerly Yishan County (宜山县), is a district under the administration of Hechi City, Guangxi Zhuang Autonomous Region, People's Republic of China.

Yizhou is located in the northwest of Guangxi on the Long River in an area noted for its magnificent karst formations. The limestone karst formations dot the district and surrounding country and several rivers cut through the landscape. The district of Yizhou has several hundred thousand inhabitants. The surrounding countryside is home to a number of ethnic Zhuang villages. The economy is centered on sugar production, with a British-Chinese jointly run sugar processing plant nearby. The countryside surrounding Yizhou is similar in appearance to the tourist Mecca Yangshuo, located in the east of Guangxi. While Yizhou has a convenient tourist infrastructure, foreign tourists are sparse.

A notable person from Yizhou is the Song Dynasty singer Liu Sanjie 刘三姐, renowned for her voice. The people of Yizhou believe that Liu was born there and a statue of her is in the district center.

In 2002 a riot struck the district. The Yizhou riots involved violence between the police and local farmers.

In Shangai, the Yishan Road and Yishan light rail station are named after the district.

On 26 August 2008 an explosion at a chemical plant killed 20 people and injured many more. 11,000 were evacuated from their homes.

Administrative divisions
Yizhou administers 7 towns, 7 townships, and 2 ethnic townships:

Towns:
Qingyuan (庆远镇), Sancha (三岔镇), Luoxi (洛西镇), Huaiyuan (怀远镇), Desheng (德胜镇), Shibie (石别镇), Beishan (北山镇)

Townships:
Xiangjian Township (祥贝乡), Liusanjie Township (刘三姐乡), Pingnan Township (屏南乡), Luodong Township (洛东乡), Fulong Yao Ethnic Township (福龙瑶族乡), Beiya Yao Ethnic Township (北牙瑶族乡), Tongde Township (同德乡), Anma Township (安马乡), Longtou Township (龙头乡)

Climate

Transportation

Rail
 Guizhou–Guangxi Railway

See also
Huang Tingjian

References

Xinhua News Agency 27 August 2008

County-level divisions of Guangxi
Administrative divisions of Hechi